Brent Hocking is an American entrepreneur. He is the founder of DeLeón Tequila, which he launched in 2009, and Virginia Black Whiskey, which he co-founded with Drake in 2016. Hocking grew up in Compton, California and has lived in Southern California for most of his life.

Hocking left his job in mortgage lending in 2006 to start his own brand of tequila, which later became known as DeLeón Tequila. Hocking bought a distillery in Jalisco, Mexico and launched the brand in 2009. Hocking sold the brand to Diageo and Sean Combs in 2014 for an undisclosed amount. Hocking is the co-founder of Virginia Black Whiskey, a venture he launched with Drake in 2016.

References 

Businesspeople from California
Food and drink company founders
Living people
Year of birth missing (living people)
People from Compton, California